Kiel Castle in Kiel in the north German state of Schleswig-Holstein was one of the secondary residences of the Gottorf dukes. The castle exhibited a very varied architectural history and in the more recent architectural period became one of the most important secular buildings in Schleswig-Holstein. The castle burned down during the Second World War and its ruins were largely carried away and replaced by a new building.

Sources 
Deert Lafrenz: Das Kieler Schloß. Christians, Hamburg 1987,

External links 

Kiel Castle Event Centre 
Information about Kiel Castle with historic pictures 

Kiel
Kiel
Buildings and structures in Kiel